Malindi Elmore (born March 13, 1980 in Kelowna, British Columbia) is a Canadian track and field athlete specialising in the middle-distance events. As of January 19, 2020 she holds the Canadian record for the marathon, running a 2:24:50.

She was a five-time All-American at Stanford University and holds the school record in the 800m and 1500m distances.

She represented Canada at the 2004 Summer Olympics, failing to qualify for the semifinals.

She won the Vancouver Sun Run in 2010 with a time of 33:06 over the 10K distance.

She qualified to represent Canada at the 2020 Summer Olympics in June 2021 and finished ninth in the women's marathon.

Competition record

Personal bests
Outdoor
800 metres – 2:02.69 (Victoria 2004)
1500 metres – 4:02.64 (Rome 2004)
One mile – 4:30.70 (Toronto 2009)
3000 metres – 8:51.90 (Rovereto 2006)
5000 metres – 15:12.12 (Walnut 2007)
10K run – 32:44 (Vancouver 2019)
Half marathon – 1:11:08 (Winnipeg 2019)
Marathon – 2:24:50 (Houston 2020)
Indoor
One mile – 4:31.03 (Fayetteville 2006)
3000 metres – 8:57.59 (Boston 2007)

References

External links
 

1980 births
Athletes (track and field) at the 2004 Summer Olympics
Athletes (track and field) at the 2020 Summer Olympics
Athletes (track and field) at the 2006 Commonwealth Games
Athletes (track and field) at the 2003 Pan American Games
Athletes (track and field) at the 2011 Pan American Games
Canadian female middle-distance runners
Living people
Olympic track and field athletes of Canada
Commonwealth Games competitors for Canada
Pan American Games bronze medalists for Canada
Pan American Games medalists in athletics (track and field)
Sportspeople from Kelowna
Universiade medalists in athletics (track and field)
Universiade bronze medalists for Canada
Competitors at the 2001 Summer Universiade
Medalists at the 2003 Summer Universiade
Medalists at the 2011 Pan American Games
21st-century Canadian women
20th-century Canadian women